Farid Belmellat (born October 18, 1970 in Kouba, Alger, Algeria) is a former Algerian footballer and the current goalkeeping coach of USM Alger.

Honours

Club
USM Alger
 Algerian Ligue Professionnelle 1 (1): 2004–05
 Algerian Cup (3): 1996–97, 1998–99, 2003–04

JS Kabylie
 Algerian Cup (1): 1991–92

References

External links
Official site

1970 births
Living people
Algerian footballers
JS Kabylie players
Footballers from Algiers
Algeria international footballers
USM Alger players
JSM Béjaïa players
USM Blida players
Expatriate footballers in Belgium
Algerian expatriate footballers
Algerian expatriate sportspeople in Belgium
RC Kouba players
Association football goalkeepers
21st-century Algerian people